Events from the year 1677 in Ireland.

Incumbent
Monarch: Charles II

Events
August 24 – James Butler, 1st Duke of Ormonde, is again sworn in as Lord Lieutenant of Ireland.
Francis Aungier, 3rd Baron Aungier of Longford, is created 1st Earl of Longford in the Peerage of Ireland.
Richard Jones, Viscount Ranelagh, is created 1st (and only) Earl of Ranelagh in the Peerage of Ireland.
Laurence Parsons is created Sir Laurence Parsons, 1st Baronet, of Birr Castle in the King's County, in the Baronetage of Ireland.
Froinsias Ó Maolmhuaidh's Grammatica Latino-Hibernica nunc compendiata, the first printed grammar of the Irish language (in Latin), is published by the Congregation of Propaganda Fide in Rome.

Births
Approximate date – Richard FitzWilliam, 5th Viscount FitzWilliam, nobleman and politician (d. 1743)
1677 or 1678 – George Farquhar, dramatist (d. 1707)

Deaths
September – Richard Bellings, lawyer and Confederate politician (b. 1677)
November 14 – John Temple, judge and politician (b. 1600)
December 21 – John Parry, Church of Ireland Bishop of Ossory.
December 31 – Theobald Taaffe, 1st Earl of Carlingford, Royalist soldier and courtier (b. c.1603)
Francis de Bermingham, Baron Athenry.
Froinsias Ó Maolmhuaidh, Franciscan friar and linguist (b. c.1605)
Probable date – John Lynch (Gratianus Lucius), Roman Catholic priest and historian (b. 1599?)

References

 
1670s in Ireland
Ireland
Years of the 17th century in Ireland